Sir Francis Lyttelton Holyoake Goodricke, 1st Baronet (1797–29 December 1865) was a British landowner and politician.

Biography
He was born Francis Lyttelton Holyoake, the eldest son of Francis Holyoake of Tettenham Hall, Staffordshire. In 1827 he married Elizabeth Martha, daughter of George Payne of Sulby Hall, Welford. In 1833 Holyoake adopted the additional name and arms of Goodricke on succeeding to a large portion of the estates of Sir Harry Goodricke (to whom he was not related), including Ribston Hall, Yorkshire. He was elected as Conservative Member of Parliament for Stafford at the 1835 general election, and shortly afterwards he was created a baronet. In May 1835 he took the Chiltern Hundreds in order to sit for South Staffordshire, following Edward Littleton's elevation to the peerage; his successor at the borough of Stafford was not elected until early 1837. Holyoake Goodricke retired from Parliament at the 1837 election. He lived at 19 Arlington Street, London and at Studley Castle, Warwickshire, and was patron of one living. Until 1858 he was a partner in the firm of Holyoake, Goodricke and Co., bankers of Wolverhampton.

References

1797 births
1865 deaths
Baronets in the Baronetage of the United Kingdom
Conservative Party (UK) MPs for English constituencies
UK MPs 1835–1837
Masters of foxhounds in England
Members of the Parliament of the United Kingdom for Stafford
High Sheriffs of Warwickshire